Peter Thomas Gain (born 11 November 1976) is a former professional footballer who played as a midfielder for Lincoln City, Dagenham & Redbridge, Tottenham Hotspur and Peterborough United. Born in Hammersmith, England, Gain represented the Republic of Ireland at youth, U-21 and B levels.

Career
In May 2012, Gain was released by Dagenham due to the expiry of his contract.

References

External links

Profile at UpThePosh! The Peterborough United Database
Unofficial Peter Gain Profile at The Forgotten Imp

Living people
1976 births
Republic of Ireland association footballers
Footballers from Hammersmith
Association football midfielders
Republic of Ireland under-21 international footballers
Republic of Ireland B international footballers
Tottenham Hotspur F.C. players
Lincoln City F.C. players
Peterborough United F.C. players
Dagenham & Redbridge F.C. players